Solidago sect. Ptarmicoidei is a section of flowering plants in the genus Solidago. They are sometimes considered a separate genus: Oligoneuron. Like related species they are known as goldenrods. This section contains seven species of perennial herbs, all native to North America. They are distinguished from other goldenrods by their corymbiform flowerheads, which are flat or rounded in profile and about as broad as tall or broader, for which they are sometimes called flat-topped goldenrods.

Species
The following seven species are included in Solidago sect. Ptarmicoidei:
Solidago houghtonii Torrey & A. Gray – Houghton's goldenrod
Solidago nitida Torrey & A. Gray – shiny goldenrod
Solidago ohioensis Riddell – Ohio goldenrod
Solidago ptarmicoides (Torrey & A. Gray) B. Boivin – stiff aster
Solidago riddellii Frank – Riddell's goldenrod
Solidago rigida Linnaeus – stiff goldenrod
Solidago vossii J.S.Pringle & Laureto – Voss's goldenrod

Named hybrids among members of the section include:
Solidago × bernardii B.Boivin (S. ptarmicoides and S. riddellii) – creamy aster
Solidago × maheuxii B.Boivin (S. riddellii and S. rigida var. humilis)
Solidago × lutescens  (Lindl. ex DC.) B.Boivin (S. ptarmicoides and S. rigida) – yellow upland goldenrod
Solidago × krotkovii B.Boivin (S. ohioense and S. ptarmicoides) – Krotkov's goldenrod

References

Flora of North America
Plant sections